Tosufloxacin is a fluoroquinolone antibiotic. It has a controversial safety profile in relation to other fluoroquinolones. It is associated with severe thrombocytopenia and nephritis, and hepatotoxicity. It is sold in Japan under the brand name Ozex.

References 

Fluoroquinolone antibiotics
Naphthyridines
Pyrrolidines
Alpha-keto acids
Aromatic ketones